"Hey Mister Heartache" is a song by English pop singer Kim Wilde, released as the first single from her sixth studio album, Close (1988). The song features vocals by Junior Giscombe; this part of the song was edited down for the single version. The song was also extended for the 12-inch and CD-single formats, and a second 12-inch featuring the "Kilo Watt" remix by Timmy Regisford was also released in the UK. Although a minor hit in Wilde's native UK, "Hey Mister Heartache" was a top-20 entry throughout Europe. The music video contains an appearance by actor Jesse Birdsall.

Track listings
7-inch single
A. "Hey Mister Heartache" – 3:51
B. "Tell Me Where You Are" – 3:11

12-inch and mini-CD single
 "Hey Mr. Heartache" – 8:05
 "Hey Mr. Heartache" (album version) – 4:36
 "Tell Me Where You Are" – 3:11

12-inch remix single
A1. "Hey Mr. Heartache" (Kilo Watt remix)
B1. "Hey Mr. Heartache" (album version) – 4:36
B2. "Tell Me Where You Are" – 3:11

CD single
 "Hey Mr. Heartache" – 8:07
 "Tell Me Where You Are" – 3:12
 "You Keep Me Hangin' On" – 4:14
 "Another Step (Closer to You)" (with Junior) – 3:33

Charts

References

External links
 

Kim Wilde songs
1988 singles
1988 songs
MCA Records singles
Songs written by Steve Byrd
Songs written by Kim Wilde